Bloomberg Beta is an early stage venture capital firm with $375M under management, capitalized solely by Bloomberg.  The fund exists to expand Bloomberg’s horizons by investing in companies built by extraordinary founders that are creating profound change in the way business operates, with a focus on machine intelligence and the future of work. Bloomberg Beta was recognized by VC review site CB Insights as the #2 investor in AI.

Led by  Roy Bahat, the firm has an unconventional investing model where anyone on the team can independently say yes to a deal. The fund's operating manual is publicly available online.

Bloomberg Beta launched in June 2013 with $75 million of funding from Bloomberg L.P. A second fund of $75 million was announced in July 2016. In October 2019, they announced a third fund of $75 million. In June of 2022, they announced a fourth fund of $75 million and their first opportunity fund, also of $75 million. Bloomberg Beta is headquartered in San Francisco, California, with additional operations in New York City.

Areas where the firm invests include: content discovery, cybersecurity, data sets and services, developer tools, full-stack startups using technology to compete in a new way, hardware, human-computer interaction, learning, media distribution, new organizational models, open-source software, productivity tools, professional networks, technology platforms, workflow tools, and workplace communication.

The firm uses data to find new customers. Their "Future Founders" project started in 2014 to predict who will start companies before they do. In 2014, it began publishing an annual Machine Intelligence landscape to better understand what was happening in the startup ecosystem with artificial intelligence and machine learning. the firm is the organizer behind "Comeback Cities," taking groups of venture capitalists and members of congress on bus tours throughout America to find untapped beds of talent and entrepreneurship.

Partners 
Bloomberg Beta consists of three full-time partners: Roy Bahat, Karin Klein, and James Cham.

Relationship with Bloomberg L.P. 
Bloomberg Beta is operated as a separate entity from Bloomberg L.P., which is the sole investor in the fund.

References 

Financial services companies established in 2013
Venture capital firms of the United States
Companies based in San Francisco
American companies established in 2013